Crucea is a commune in Constanța County, Northern Dobruja, Romania.

The commune includes six villages:
 Crucea (historical name: Satișchioi)
 Băltăgești
 Crișan (historical name: Capugi) - named after , also known as Crișan, one of the leaders of the 1784-1785 peasant revolt in Transylvania
 Gălbiori (historical name: Sarâgea)
 Șiriu (historical name: Sublocotenent Măndoiu)
 Stupina (historical name: Ercheșec)

Demographics
At the 2011 census, Crucea had 2,768 Romanians (99.39%), 5 Roma  (0.18%), 7 Turks (0.25%), 5 others (0.18%).

References

Communes in Constanța County
Localities in Northern Dobruja